The 1986 Nordic Indoor Athletics Championships was the inaugural edition of the international indoor athletics competition between Nordic countries and was held in Lidingö, Sweden. It consisted of 22 individual track and field events, 12 for men and 10 for women.

Finland was the most successful nation, taking ten golds in a total haul of 30 medals. Sweden placed second with ten golds among their 21 medals. Denmark won four medals, two of them gold, while Norway won ten medals, though none were gold. Maria Fernström of Sweden was the most successful athlete of the tournament, winning a women's

Medal summary

Men

Women

Medal table

References
Nordic Indoor Championships. GBR Athletics. Retrieved 2018-05-20.

1986
Nordic Championships
Nordic Championships
Lidingö Municipality
International athletics competitions hosted by Sweden